Carbon filtering is a method of filtering that uses a bed of activated carbon to remove impurities from a fluid using adsorption.

Mechanism
Carbon filtering works by adsorption, in which pollutants in the fluid to be treated are trapped inside the pore structure of a carbon substrate. The substrate is made of many carbon granules, each of which is itself highly porous. As a result, the substrate has a large surface area within which contaminants can be trapped. Activated carbon is typically used in filters, as it has been treated to have a much higher surface area than non treated carbon. One gram of activated carbon has a surface area in excess of 3,000 m2 (32,000 sq ft).

Common uses

Carbon filtering is commonly used for water purification, air filtering and industrial gas processing, for example the removal of siloxanes and hydrogen sulfide from biogas.  It is also used in a number of other applications, including respirator masks, the purification of sugarcane, some methods of coffee decaffeination, and in the recovery of precious metals, especially gold. It is also used in cigarette filters and in the EVAP used in cars.

When filtering water, charcoal carbon filters are most effective at removing chlorine, particles such as sediment, volatile organic compounds (VOCs), taste and odor.  They are not effective at removing minerals, salts, and dissolved inorganic substances.

Specifications

Each carbon filter is typically given a micron rating that specifies the size of particle which the filter can remove from a fluid. Typical particle sizes which can be removed by carbon filters range from 0.5 to 50 μm. The efficacy of a carbon filter depends not only on its particle size, but also on the rate of flow of fluid through the filter. For example, if a fluid is allowed to flow through the filter at a slower rate, the contaminants will be exposed to the filter media for a longer amount of time, which will tend to result in fewer impurities.

See also 

 Water filter
 List of waste-water treatment technologies

References 

 U.S. Environmental Protection Agency (EPA), Washington, D.C. (2013). "Granular Activated Carbon." Drinking Water Treatability Database.

Water technology
Filters
Gas technologies